{{DISPLAYTITLE:C10H12O4}}
The molecular formula C10H12O4 may refer to:

 Acetosyringone, a chemical compound
 Atraric acid
 Brevifolin
 Cantharidin, a poisonous chemical compound secreted by many species of blister beetles
 2-(4-Methoxyphenoxy)propionic acid
 Sparassol
 3,4,5-Trimethoxybenzaldehyde